(English: I am a Moravian), sometimes also called  (English: Oh, Moravia), is a song composed by Václav Novotný in late 19th century. , is, along with Moravo, Moravo and Bože cos ráčil, considered one of the anthems of historical region Moravia in the Czech Republic. Out of these three,  is most commonly recognized as the primary unofficial anthem, although it is rarely used nowadays.

The newer version has become popular among members of the all-age gymnastics organization Sokol, which also promoted Czech nationalism amongst the Czech people in opposition to Austrian and Hungarian dominance within Austria-Hungary. Sokol was disbanded in Czechoslovakia after the Communist coup d'état in 1948 due to ideological reasons and the fact that many Sokol members participated as part of the Western resistance against Nazi Germany. Although the Sokols reappeared briefly during the Prague Spring of 1968, the Sokol movement was revived again after the 1989 revolution.  is sometimes sung by Sokols on important occasions since then.

Lyrics

Pivoda's lyrics

Original lyrics

References

External links
 https://vlast.cz/jsem-moravan/

Anthems
Czech songs
Moravia